Nogometno društvo Adria Miren, commonly referred to as ND Adria or simply Adria, is a Slovenian football club from Miren which plays in the Slovenian Third League. The club was founded in 1957.

Honours
Slovenian Third Division
 Winners: 1991–92, 2009–10

MNZ Nova Gorica Cup
 Winners: 2010–11

References

External links
Official website 
Soccerway profile

Association football clubs established in 1957
Football clubs in Slovenia
1957 establishments in Slovenia